Heramyia is a genus of picture-winged flies in the family Ulidiidae.

Species
 H. populicola

References

Ulidiidae